Mount St Joseph School is a coeducational Roman Catholic secondary school located in Farnworth, Greater Manchester, England.

History
Mount St Joseph School was established in 1902 by the Sisters of the Cross and Passion.

Direct grant grammar school
After World War II it became a girls' direct grant grammar school.

Comprehensive
It was converted to a comprehensive school in 1979. The school was awarded Business and Enterprise College status in the early 2000s and was renamed Mount St Joseph Business & Enterprise College for a time.

The school's centenary was celebrated in 2002 with the design of a stained glass window in the chapel in the central area of the school. This was designed by a former pupil and incorporates the religious background of the school in its Roman Catholic Heritage.

Admissions
Today Mount St Joseph is a voluntary aided school administered by Bolton Metropolitan Borough Council and the Roman Catholic Diocese of Salford. The school offers GCSEs, BTECs and NVQs as programmes of study for pupils.

As of the academic year of 2011-2012 the school has used a house system, consisting of Nelson Mandela House, William Shakespeare House and Edward Jenner House. The most successful house as of May 2016 is Shakespeare House with two consecutive house competition wins over the running period. The competitions are based upon many factors from punctuality of the students to checking of equipment.

The school offers a wide range of curriculum in a wide range of subjects such as: GCSE Mathematics, GCSE English Language, GCSE English Literature, GCSE Core Science, GCSE Additional Science, GCSE Biology, GCSE Chemistry, GCSE Physics, GCSE Geography, GCSE History, GCSE Religious Studies, GCSE Graphic Design, GCSE ICT, GCSE Computer Science, GCSE French, GCSE Spanish, GCSE Physical Education, GCSE Art, GCSE Photography, GCSE Catering, BTEC Business Studies, BTEC Health and Social Care and Level 2 Certificate in Further Mathematics.

The school's Latin motto "Vitae Via Virtus" translates and means "Virtue is the way of Life".

Notable former pupils

 Peter Kay, BAFTA Winning actor, comedian, director and writer 
 Jason Kenny, World and Olympic Champion track cyclist
 Ruth Madeley, actress
 Paddy McGuinness, comedian, actor, television personality/presenter
 Ayaz Bhuta, GB wheelchair rugby para-Olympian

Direct-grant grammar school
 Mary Bousted (née Bleasdale), General Secretary from 2003 to 2017 of the Association of Teachers and Lecturers (ATL) Presently (from 2017) Joint General Secretary of the National Education Union (NEU).

References

External links
Mount St Joseph official website

Educational institutions established in 1902
1902 establishments in England
Catholic secondary schools in the Diocese of Salford
Secondary schools in the Metropolitan Borough of Bolton
Voluntary aided schools in England